Swimming with Men is a 2018 British sports comedy-drama film starring Rob Brydon, Jane Horrocks, Rupert Graves, Daniel Mays, Thomas Turgoose, Jim Carter, Adeel Akhtar and Charlotte Riley. It was directed by Oliver Parker.

Screenwriter Aschlin Ditta based the script on the 2010 Swedish documentary Men Who Swim.

Plot
When accountant Eric (Brydon) seeks to win back his wife Heather (Horrocks), he stumbles upon a solution in the form of a male synchronised swimming team: Men Who Swim. Joining his local team, Eric finds brotherhood in this crew as they train for the World Championships in Milan.

Cast
 Rob Brydon as Eric Scott
 Jane Horrocks as Heather Scott
 Rupert Graves as Luke
 Daniel Mays as Colin
 Adeel Akhtar as Kurt
 Thomas Turgoose as Tom
 Jim Carter as Ted
 Charlotte Riley as Susan
 Nathaniel Parker as Lewis

Production
The scenes from the championship competition were filmed at the 25 x 50 metre pool in Basildon Sporting Village.

Release
The film closed the Edinburgh International Film Festival on 1 July 2018. It went on general release in the UK on 4 July.

Reception
On Rotten Tomatoes the film has a score of  based on reviews from  critics. The site's consensus states: "Swimming with Men touches on thought-provoking themes surrounding modern masculinity, but ultimately never manages to do much more than tread water."

Peter Bradshaw of The Guardian gave the film 3/5. Empire gave it two stars and compared it unfavorably to The Full Monty.

See also
 , a similar film from 2008
 Sink or Swim, a similar film from 2018

References

External links
 

2018 films
2010s sports comedy-drama films
British sports comedy-drama films
Films about friendship
Midlife crisis films
Synchronized swimming films
Vertigo Films films
2010s English-language films
2010s British films